SOS Israel is a militant Israeli Jewish political movement founded by Rabbi Shalom Dov Wolpo, which is opposed to any agreement leading to land concessions to the Palestinians. 

Wolpo later formed a political party, Our Land of Israel.

References

Politics of Israel